Pyrausta ferrealis is a moth in the family Crambidae. It was described by George Hampson in 1900. It is found in Turkey and Armenia.

References

Moths described in 1900
ferrealis
Moths of Europe
Moths of Asia